Reigan Elisse Derry (born 19 September 1988), also known mononymously as Reigan, is an Australian singer and songwriter. Derry rose to fame after placing eleventh on the fourth season of Australian Idol in 2006. The following year, she became a member of the Australian pop duo Scarlett Belle, who disbanded in 2011. Three years later, Derry placed fourth on the sixth season of The X Factor Australia. She subsequently received a recording contract with Sony Music Australia and released her debut extended play, All of the Pieces, in December 2014. Currently Reigan  works as a club singer for various agencies in Sydney and the Gold Coast.

Early life
Reigan Elisse Derry was born on 19 September 1988 in Maida Vale, Western Australia. Derry began singing at an early age and took on classical lessons at the age of fourteen. She was a student at Perth Modern School, where she completed a music scholarship majoring in voice. During her high school years, Derry had already worked with the West Australian Symphony Orchestra and was an understudy in the musical The King and I at the Regal Theatre. She was also a member of a Christian band called Djreamz. Prior to entering Australian Idol, Derry worked as a receptionist. Reigan is of Anglo Burmese ancestry.

Career

2006–2011: Scarlett Belle

At the age of eighteen, and after a brief stint on Australian Idol, Reigan relocated from Maida Vale to Sydney to pursue a pop career with Australian girl group, Scarlett Belle. The group signed a record deal with US label Def Jam Recordings in 2007. Based between Los Angeles and Sydney, Scarlett Belle began to work on their debut album with Ne-Yo, Snoop Dogg, JR Rotem, Nate Dogg and StarGate, as well as Australian producers Rudy Sandapa and Israel Cruz. However, in 2008, Scarlett Belle were dropped from Def Jam Recordings and founding member Hayley Aitken left the group, leaving Derry and fellow member Tamara Jaber as a duo. They later signed with Sony Music Australia and released their debut single "Closure" in June 2010, which peaked at number 38 on the ARIA Singles Chart.

Scarlett Belle released their second single in August 2010, a cover of Cruz's 2009 song "Freak Tonight". Featuring guest vocal appearances from Cruz and rapper Miracle, the song peaked at number 29 on the ARIA Singles Chart. Their third and final single "Lover Boy" was released in November 2010, but failed to impact the charts. In May 2011, it was announced that Scarlett Belle had disbanded to pursue their solo careers.

2012-13: "With You"
In August 2013, Reigan Derry featured on the song "With You" by OLIC.

2014–2016: The X factor, All of the Pieces and December
Reigan Derry was a 26-year who auditioned for The X Factor singing "Someone like You" by Adele and progressed to the super bootcamp round of the competition. For the first challenge of bootcamp, Derry was placed into a group with two other contestants from her category to perform a song together for the judges. Derry made it to the second bootcamp challenge, where she performed a ballad version of "Numb" by Linkin Park to the judges and a live audience of one thousand. She then progressed to the home visits round in Las Vegas and performed "Locked Out of Heaven" by Bruno Mars in front of her mentor Redfoo and guest mentor Nicole Scherzinger. Redfoo later selected Derry for the live shows. Derry was in the bottom two for the first time in week eight, with Jason Heerah, another act in the Over 25s category, but was saved after the judges' vote went to deadlock and Heerah was eliminated. After the eliminations of Rochelle Pitt in week six and Heerah in week eight, Derry became the last remaining contestant in Redfoo's category. Derry was in the bottom two again in week ten, this time with Marlisa Punzalan, but was eliminated after the judges' vote went to deadlock and she received the fewest public votes.

On 29 October 2014, it was announced that Derry had received a recording contract with Sony Music Australia. Derry's debut extended play, All of the Pieces, was released on 12 December 2014 and features studio recordings of selected songs she performed on The X Factor. The EP's title track was serviced to Australian radio stations on 27 November 2014 as Derry's debut solo single, and debuted at number 33 on the ARIA Singles Chart. Derry's second single "Feels Like Heaven" was released on 4 September 2015, as the lead single from her upcoming debut studio album, and debuted at number 37 on the ARIA Singles Chart. On 2 October 2015, she released "Always Know My Truth" as the album's second single, which did not chart. She worked on the album for nine months in Australia, Sweden and the UK with several songwriters, including Jake Gosling, Adam Argyle, Jon Hume, Trinity and David Ryan Harris. In March 2016, it was speculated that Derry had been dropped by record company Sony Music, along with other X Factor finalists Nathaniel Willemse, Marlisa Punzalan and Dean Ray.

Performances on The X Factor

2019–present

In March 2019, Reigan featured on a Bombs Away's cover version of "You Gotta Be" and Some's Blonde's "Set You Free".

After being dropped by her record company, Reigan became a vocalist for hire and recorded a number of demo vocals to be used as a guide. One of the demos she recorded was of her singing Fleetwood Mac's "Dreams", which was then used in the dance version by Jolyon Petch. This cover version, which reached number 16 on the ARIA Singles Chart and number one on the ARIA Club Tracks chart.  However, as the vocal was only supposed to be for demo purposes, Reigan alleged that the New Zealand-born producer had used her cover without her consent or any written agreement between the two artists and that she had received no royalties from the hit record. This dispute was later settled between the two artists in 2022, and she has since been credited on the track across all platforms.

Artistry
Aside from singing, Derry also plays the guitar and piano. Reigan includes a variety of singers and musician's as her musical influences.

Discography

Extended plays

Singles

Notes

Other charted songs

Music videos

Awards and nominations

ARIA Music Awards
The ARIA Music Awards is an annual awards ceremony that recognises excellence, innovation, and achievement across all genres of the music of Australia. 

! 
|-
| 2022
| "Dreams" (Jolyon Petch feat. Reigan)
| ARIA Award for Song of the Year
| 
| 
|-

References

External links

1988 births
Living people
Musicians from Perth, Western Australia
Australian women singer-songwriters
Australian Idol participants
The X Factor (Australian TV series) contestants
Scarlett Belle members
21st-century Australian singers
21st-century Australian women singers